

Wilhelm-Francis Ochsner (31 March 1899 – 5 December 1990) was a German general in the Wehrmacht during World War II who commanded several divisions. He was a recipient of the Knight's Cross of the Iron Cross.

Ochsner surrendered to the Red Army in the summer of 1944 in the course of Soviet Operation Bagration. In 1947 he was sentenced to 25 years imprisonment for war crimes committed against the citizens of the Soviet Union. Ochsner was released in 1955.

Awards and decorations

 Knight's Cross of the Iron Cross on 18 January 1944 as Oberst and commander of 31. Infanterie-Division

References

Citations

Bibliography

 

1899 births
1990 deaths
Military personnel from Munich
People from the Kingdom of Bavaria
German Army personnel of World War I
Lieutenant generals of the German Army (Wehrmacht)
Recipients of the clasp to the Iron Cross, 1st class
Recipients of the Gold German Cross
Recipients of the Knight's Cross of the Iron Cross
German prisoners of war in World War II held by the Soviet Union
Nazis convicted of war crimes
German Army generals of World War II